The Sami revolt in Guovdageaidnu, also known as the Kautokeino uprising, was a revolt in the town of Kautokeino in northern Norway in 1852 by a group of Sami who attacked representatives of the Norwegian authorities.  The rebels killed the local merchant and the local lensmann, whipped their servants and the village priest, and burned down the merchant's house.  The rebels were later seized by other Sami, who killed two of the rebels in the process.  Two of the leaders, Mons Somby and Aslak Hætta, were later executed by the Norwegian government.

Background
The incident was connected to a religious revival movement that was inspired by the preacher Lars Levi Laestadius.  His teaching, which had great influence on the Sami in Norway at the time, demanded a more spiritually pure lifestyle and abstaining from alcohol. The movement turned more militant as their followers, called Laestadians, saw the Norwegian State Church as too close to the state-run alcohol industry.  They formed their own congregations separate from the state church. In a short period of time, a minority of these followers became more militant. They believed their moral authority was greater than that of the state church, and they were later accused of interrupting its services.

During this time, the Sami were economically far poorer than the Norwegian settlers in the north, counting wealth in reindeer or other livestock (rather than currency), and they were considered socially inferior to the Norwegians.  The local merchant, who sold the local Sami liquor, was a target for the rebellion due to his repeated cheating and exploitation of Sami customers, many of whom were vulnerable alcoholics.  Alcoholism was widespread and had been highly destructive to the Sami and their culture during this time.  The Laestadians were against the sale and use of liquor. Thus, the Sami were at odds not only with the local priest and merchant but also Norwegian law.

Aftermath
All the men arrested for participating in the revolt - except the two leaders Aslak Hætta and Mons Somby (who were beheaded in Alta) - ended up in Akershus Fortress at Oslo. The women, including Ellen Aslaksdatter Skum, were imprisoned in Trondheim. Many of the rebels died after a few years in captivity. Among the survivors was Lars Hætta, who had been 18 years old at the time of imprisonment. He was given the time and means in jail to make the first translation of the Bible into North Sámi.

The Kautokeino rebellion was one of the few violent reactions by the Sami against the exploitation policies of the Norwegian government and was the only known confrontation between Samis and Norwegians with loss of human lives.  The rebellion was not a direct response to the forced assimilation policy of Norwegianization that later became an official government policy, but the 1852 rebellion affected the choices made by the new Norwegian state as this policy was implemented.

The opera Aslak Hetta  (1922) by  Finnish composer, Armas Launis tells the story of the rebellion in somewhat romanticized form.

See also 
The Kautokeino Rebellion - 2008 film about the 1852 riots

References

External links 
 NRK Radio interview Niillas Somby, descendant of Mons Somby November 13, 2008. Retrieved February 18, 2009. .
 Kautokeino-opprøret: Kautokeino 1852, April 17, 1997.  Retrieved February 21, 2009.  Dagogtid.no

1852 in Norway
19th-century rebellions

Laestadianism
Religious riots
Rebellions in Europe
Sámi in Norway
Sámi history
19th-century murders in Norway
History of Finnmark
Conflicts in 1852
 
Kautokeino
Military history of the Arctic